The Hassalo on Eighth is a multi-building, mixed-use high-rise building located in the Lloyd District of Portland, Oregon, United States. The three-building development contains both residential and commercial space.

History
The project was announced in March 2012 by Langley Investment Properties, and at that time called for 750 apartments on the superblock at Eighth Avenue and Hassalo Street along NE Holladay Street. Construction on the development began in September 2013 with the number of apartments reduced to around 660. The tallest building in the project topped out in February 2015. Construction on the buildings concluded in October 2015.

Details
The complex's name comes from its location at the intersection of NE Hassalo and Eighth streets in the Lloyd District. Aster Tower is the tallest of the three buildings, rising to 265 feet and 21 stories. Hassalo on Eighth was developed by American Assets Trust at a cost of $192 million. It includes 657 apartments and almost 1,200 bike parking spaces, plus ground floor retail.

See also

List of tallest buildings in Portland, Oregon

References

External links

Official site

2015 establishments in Oregon
Lloyd District, Portland, Oregon
Northeast Portland, Oregon
Residential buildings completed in 2015
Residential skyscrapers in Portland, Oregon